David MacKinnon (born December 15, 1994) is an American professional baseball first baseman for the Saitama Seibu Lions of Nippon Professional Baseball (NPB). He previously played in Major League Baseball (MLB) for the Los Angeles Angels and Oakland Athletics. MacKinnon played college baseball at the University of Hartford and was selected by the Angels in the 32nd round of the 2017 Major League Baseball draft.

Amateur career
MacKinnon attended Oliver Ames High School in Easton, Massachusetts, where he played baseball and soccer. 

After graduating high school, MacKinnon enrolled at the University of Hartford where he played both sports for all four years of college. In 2015, he played collegiate summer baseball with the Wareham Gatemen of the Cape Cod Baseball League (CCBL) and was named a league all-star. He returned to the CCBL in 2016 with the Bourne Braves. During his senior baseball season at Hartford in 2017, MacKinnon batted .327 with zero home runs and 18 RBIs over fifty games. After the season, he was selected by the Los Angeles Angels in the 32nd round of the 2017 Major League Baseball draft.

Professional career

Los Angeles Angels
MacKinnon signed with the Angels and split his first professional season between the Arizona League Angels and Orem Owlz. He played 2018 with the Burlington Bees and Inland Empire 66ers, 2019 with the 66ers, and 2021 with the Rocket City Trash Pandas. With the Trash Pandas in 2021, he earned Double-A South Player of the Month honors in June. He opened the 2022 season with the Salt Lake Bees and earned Pacific Coast League Player of the Month honors in May.

On June 18, 2022, the Angels selected MacKinnon's contract and promoted him to the major leagues. At the time of his promotion, he was batting .327 with 13 home runs over 56 games with Salt Lake. He made his MLB debut that night as the starting first baseman versus the Seattle Mariners and went hitless over two at-bats. He recorded his first major league hit on June 22, an RBI single in the seventh inning against the Kansas City Royals. On August 2, MacKinnon was designated for assignment.

Oakland Athletics
On August 5, 2022, MacKinnon was claimed off waivers by the Oakland Athletics. He was assigned to the Triple-A Las Vegas Aviators of the Pacific Coast League and initially spent eight games with the team. On August 16, MacKinnon was promoted to the major leagues to replace an injured Ramón Laureano on the roster. In six major league games for Oakland, MacKinnon went 0-for-13. On August 28, he was optioned to Las Vegas. In 16 games for Las Vegas, MacKinnon batted .297 with a home run and nine RBIs. He was non-tendered by the Athletics and became a free agent on November 18.

Saitama Seibu Lions
On December 19, 2022, MacKinnon signed with the Saitama Seibu Lions of Nippon Professional Baseball.

Personal life
MacKinnon and his wife, Jordan, had their first child, a son, in March 2022.

References

External links

Hartford Hawks bio

1994 births
Living people
People from Easton, Massachusetts
Baseball players from Massachusetts
Major League Baseball first basemen
Los Angeles Angels players
Oakland Athletics players
Hartford Hawks baseball players
Bourne Braves players
Wareham Gatemen players
Arizona League Angels players
Orem Owlz players
Burlington Bees players
Inland Empire 66ers of San Bernardino players
Rocket City Trash Pandas players
Salt Lake Bees players
Mesa Solar Sox players